Joseph Mwengi Mutua (born 10 December 1978 in Machakos, Eastern Province) is a Kenyan runner who specializes in the 800 metres.

His personal best time is 1:43.33 minutes, achieved in August 2002 in Zürich. He holds the African indoor record in 800 m with 1:44.71 minutes, achieved in January 2004 in Stuttgart.

He twice competed at the Summer Olympics. In 2000, he failed to advance 800 metres heats, but was part of the Kenyan 4*400m relay team that reached semifinals. At the 2004 Summer Olympics, he reached 800 metres semifinals.

He won the Kenyan national championships in 2002, 2003 and 2004.

He was part of the 4 × 800 m relay team who currently holds the world record.

Achievements

References

External links

1978 births
Living people
Kenyan male middle-distance runners
Olympic male middle-distance runners
Athletes (track and field) at the 2000 Summer Olympics
Athletes (track and field) at the 2004 Summer Olympics
Olympic athletes of Kenya
People from Machakos County
Commonwealth Games medallists in athletics
Commonwealth Games silver medallists for Kenya
Athletes (track and field) at the 2002 Commonwealth Games
World Athletics record holders (relay)
Medallists at the 2002 Commonwealth Games